Lepeostegeres is a genus of flowering plants belonging to the family Loranthaceae.

Its native range is Malesia to New Guinea.

Species:

Lepeostegeres acutibracteus 
Lepeostegeres alveolatus 
Lepeostegeres bahajensis 
Lepeostegeres beccarii 
Lepeostegeres cebuensis 
Lepeostegeres centiflorus 
Lepeostegeres congestiflorus 
Lepeostegeres deciduus 
Lepeostegeres gemmiflorus 
Lepeostegeres lancifolius

References

Loranthaceae
Loranthaceae genera